Peyrusse-le-Roc is a commune in the Aveyron department in southern France.

The Château Inférieur is a ruined castle which was taken by the English in 1163 and occupied by Simon de Montfort.

Population

See also
Communes of the Aveyron department

References

Communes of Aveyron
Aveyron communes articles needing translation from French Wikipedia